Lakers du Lac Saint-Louis was a Canadian women's semi-professional soccer club based in Lachine, Montréal, Quebec that played in the Première ligue de soccer du Québec.

History

The club was formed by the Association Régionale de Soccer du Lac St-Louis to participate in the newly formed women's division of the Première ligue de soccer du Québec, taking the regional approach, rather than to have one of their member clubs form a team. Patrick Viollat was named the club's head coach. The team had a disappointing season finishing in last place. After the first season, they departed the league, with the association transferring control of the team over to CS Mont-Royal Outremont, one of its member clubs for 2019.

Season 
Women

References

Soccer clubs in Quebec
Lakers du Lac Saint-Louis
Women's soccer clubs in Canada